Caroline Ann Brothers is an Australian-born novelist, nonfiction writer, and former foreign correspondent now based in London.

Early life and education
Brothers was born in Hobart, Australia, and grew up in Melbourne. She studied history at the University of Melbourne and gained a Ph.D. at University College London, where her thesis was on press photography in the Spanish Civil War. In 1997, she published a book based on her doctoral studies, War and photography : a cultural history.

Career

After Brothers completed her doctorate she joined Reuters where she was trained as a foreign correspondent. She has reported from places including Amsterdam, Belfast, Brussels, London, Mexico City and Paris,  for publications including  the International Herald Tribune and The New York Times. She has also published work in Granta,  The Sunday Times Magazine, The Guardian, the British Journal of Photography and Meanjin and elsewhere.

She was a journalist working in France when she met some Afghan refugees and her account of their life in temporary camps made The New York Times. However she wanted to write more about this subject. Her first novel was called, Hinterland was it was published in 2012 and it tells the tale of two young Afghan brothers as they cross Europe trying to reach England. The Independent's reviewer said that "Brothers uses her journalistic skills to tell a story that has the horrible ring of truth". It has been adapted as the theatrical installation Flight, produced by Glasgow-based theatre company Vox Motus at the Edinburgh International Festival and in locations including Ireland, the UAE and New York.  Her second novel, The Memory Stones concerns a family who were in Buenos Aires in 1979 during Argentina's Dirty War and their search for their "disappeared"; Anita Sethi said of it: "This rough diamond of a novel is a lyrical portrait of brutality that lingers in the memory".

She has been a Royal Literary Fund Fellow at the University of Westminster twice, at its Harrow site in 2018/19 and at the Cavendish site in 2019/20. 
In 2022, she was one of the judges for the Society of Authors' inaugural Gordon Bowker Volcano Prize.

Selected publications

References

External links

Year of birth missing (living people)
Living people
University of Melbourne alumni
Alumni of University College London
People from Hobart
Australian foreign correspondents
Reuters people
Australian novelists
Australian women novelists
21st-century novelists